|}

The Ballysax Stakes is a Group 3 flat horse race in Ireland open to three-year-old thoroughbreds. It is run over a distance of 1 mile and 2 furlongs (2,012 metres) at Leopardstown in April.

History
The event was formerly held at the Curragh, and it used to be classed at Listed level. It was transferred to Leopardstown in 1993, and promoted to Group 3 status in 2003. The 2014 running was held at Navan as the normal Leopardstown fixture was judged to be too early in the season to serve as a trial race for the European classics.

The Ballysax Stakes is currently run in memory of Patrick W. McGrath (died 2001). McGrath served as chairman of the Racing Board (a precursor of Horse Racing Ireland), which purchased Leopardstown Racecourse in 1967. The race serves as trial race for various European classics and the most recent winner to go on to a classic victory was Harzand, winner of the Epsom Derby in 2016.

Records
Leading jockey since 1986 (6 wins):
 Michael Kinane – Cheering News (1990), Humbel (1995), Casey Tibbs (1997), Cupid (1999), Galileo (2001), High Chaparral (2002)

Leading trainer since 1986 (11 wins):

 Aidan O'Brien – Cupid (1999), Galileo (2001), High Chaparral (2002), Balestrini (2003), Yeats (2004), Fame and Glory (2009), Battle of Marengo (2013), Nelson (2018), Broome (2019), Nobel Prize (2020), Bolshoi Ballet (2021)

Winners since 1986

See also
 Horse racing in Ireland
 List of Irish flat horse races

References

 Paris-Turf: 
 Racing Post:

 galopp-sieger.de – Ballysax Stakes.
 horseracingintfed.com – International Federation of Horseracing Authorities – Ballysax Stakes (2019).
 pedigreequery.com – Ballysax Stakes – Leopardstown.

Flat horse races for three-year-olds
Leopardstown Racecourse
Flat races in Ireland